Judith Trachtenberg is a 1920 German silent drama film directed by Henrik Galeen and starring Leontine Kühnberg, Ernst Deutsch and Leonhard Haskel. It was based on the 1890 novel of the same title by Karl Emil Franzos. In 1932 it was released in the United States, re-edited to include sound, under the alternative title A Daughter of Her People. It was one of a significant cycle of films in the early 1920s which dealt with issues of Jewish cultural assimilation including Love One Another (1922), The Ancient Law (1923) and The City Without Jews (1924). The film's plotline of a Jewish woman becoming involved with an aristocratic figure follows what is known as an "Esterka story".

Synopsis
In the nineteenth century, a young Jewish woman living in the part of Poland controlled by Austria, meets an Austrian Count at a ball held by one of her father's business associates. After he rescues her from the unwanted attentions of a Polish army officer, they fall in love. She falls pregnant, and they live together in a Common-law marriage. Her family are horrified by the match and make her an outcast. Distraught by this, she ultimately commits suicide by drowning herself in a lake.

Cast
 Leontine Kühnberg as Judith Trachtenberg 
 Ernst Deutsch as Judith's Brother 
 Leonhard Haskel as Father Trachtenberg 
 Paul Otto as Count Agenor Baranowski 
 Hermann Vallentin as Prefect von Wroblewski 
 Max Adalbert as Fürst Metternich 
 Friedrich Kühne as Ignaz Trudka 
 Ernst Pröckl as Severin von Tronski 
 Margarete Kupfer as Frau von Wroblewski 
 Frida Richard as Mirjam

References

Bibliography
 Prawer, S.S. Between Two Worlds: The Jewish Presence in German and Austrian Film, 1910-1933. Berghahn Books, 2005.

External links
 

1920 films
Films of the Weimar Republic
German silent feature films
German historical drama films
1920s historical drama films
Films directed by Henrik Galeen
Films based on Austrian novels
Films set in the 19th century
Films set in Poland
Films set in Austria
Films set in Germany
Films with screenplays by Franz Schulz
German black-and-white films
1920 drama films
Silent drama films
1920s German films